Sugarville is an unincorporated community in Millard County, Utah, United States.

References

Unincorporated communities in Millard County, Utah
Unincorporated communities in Utah